The 2013 African Junior Athletics Championships was the eleventh edition of the biennial, continental athletics tournament for African athletes aged 19 years or younger. It was held at the Germain Comarmond Stadium in Bambous, Mauritius from 29 August – 1 September. A total of 223 athletes from 29 nations competed. Neither pole vault event was held, due to a lack of entries, and the decathlon and heptathlon competitions were also not contested.

Originally scheduled to be held in South Africa, a dispute between Athletics South Africa and the national sports ministry resulted in the cancellation of holding rights in June 2013. Bambous, the 2009 host, stepped in at short notice to hold the event.

The medal table was a closely contested affair. Nigeria had the most gold medals with nine in its haul of 19 medals. South Africa had seven golds, but had the highest overall total with 24 medals. Ethiopia also had seven golds, and had the second highest medal haul with 22. Egypt (five golds, 11 in total) and Kenya (four golds, 17 in total) were the next best performing nations. Of the 29 participating nations, 15 reached the medal table. Nigeria performed well in the sprinting events, Ethiopia and Kenya shared most of the middle- and long-distance running medals, while South Africa and Egypt took many medals in the field events.

Wind affected most of the sprints and jumps events, slowing the track times and carrying the jumpers to further distances.

Several athletes won multiple individual medals. Among them, Martin Moses Kurong was the men's 10,000 m winner and 5000 m bronze medallist, Geraldine Ann Duvenhage and Mohamed Kalifa were double silver medallists in the men's and women's shot put and discus throw events, and Tegest Tamangnu Yuma was runner-up in both the women's short sprints. South Africa's Duwayne Boer was the long jump winner and took bronze in the triple jump. Nigeria's Ese Brume was the women's long jump winner and triple jump runner-up, as well as a gold medallist in the 4×100 metres relay. South Africa's Megan Wilke won the javelin throw and surprisingly she also took the high jump silver medal.

Nigeria's 200 m champion, Divine Oduduru, progressed to the junior level after his sprint double at the 2013 African Youth Athletics Championships. The Ethiopian duo Tigist Gashaw and Dawit Seyaum were first and second in the women's 1500 metres, switching their placings from the 2013 World Youth Championships in Athletics.

Medal summary

Men

Women

† A third team from Mauritius was present in the women's 4 × 100 m relay but failed to finish the race.
‡ Long jump winner Ese Brume also had a wind-legal jump of 6.22 metres.

Medal table

Participation

 (10)
 (2)
 (6)
 (2)
 (1)
 (11)
 (5)
 (41)
 (3)
 (6)
 (20)
 (1)
 (1)
 (1)
 (1)
 (21)
 (8)
 (3)
 (3)
 (22)
 (1)
 (4)
 (3)
 (29)
 (1)
 (1)
 (4)
 (4)
 (8)

References

Results
Time schedule for XIemes JUN CHAMPIONNATS D'AFRIQUE  . Timetronics. Retrieved on 2013-09-14.
XIemes JUN CHAMPIONNATS D'AFRIQUE . Timetronics. Retrieved on 2013-09-14.
Complete Results Men. MAA. Retrieved on 2013-09-14.
Complete Results Women. MAA. Retrieved on 2013-09-14.

External links
Official website

African Junior Athletics Championships
African Junior Athletics Championships
African Junior Athletics Championships
African Junior Athletics Championships
Bambous, Mauritius
International athletics competitions hosted by Mauritius
2013 in youth sport